Coldstream Cottage Hospital was a community hospital located at Coldstream in Scotland. It was managed by NHS Borders.

History 
The hospital was established following a donation from  the Earl of Home. It was designed by John McLachlan and opened in 1888. It was extended by the addition of a second floor in 1912. It joined the National Health Service in 1948, but, following a consultation, it closed in October 2006.

References 

Hospitals in the Scottish Borders
Defunct hospitals in Scotland